"What the World Needs Now Is Love" is a 1965 popular song with lyrics by Hal David and music composed by Burt Bacharach. First recorded and made popular by Jackie DeShannon, it was released on April 15, 1965, on the Imperial label after a release on sister label Liberty records the previous month was canceled. It peaked at number seven on the US Hot 100 in July of that year.  In Canada, the song reached number one.

Songwriting
Co-songwriter Burt Bacharach revealed in his 2014 autobiography that this song had among the most difficult lyrics Hal David ever wrote, despite being deceptively simple as a pop hit. He explained that they had the main melody and chorus written back in 1962, centering on a waltz tempo, but it took another two years for David to finally come up with the lyric, "Lord, we don't need another mountain." Once David worked out the verses, Bacharach said the song essentially "wrote itself" and they finished it in a day or two.

The song's success caught the two songwriters completely by surprise, since they were very aware of the controversy and disagreements among Americans about the Vietnam War, which was the subtext for David's lyrics. Bacharach has continuously used the song as the intro and finale for most of his live concert appearances well into the 2000s.

Recording history
The song was originally offered to singer Dionne Warwick, who turned it down at the time, saying she felt it was "too country" for her tastes and "too preachy" though she later recorded it for her album Here Where There Is Love. (Warwick also recorded a second version in 1996, which scraped the lower reaches of the US Hot 100.) Bacharach initially did not believe in the song, and was reluctant to play it for DeShannon. The song was also rejected by Gene Pitney, reportedly over a financial dispute. DeShannon's version was recorded on March 23, 1965, at New York's Bell Sound Studios. Bacharach arranged, conducted and produced the session. In 1966 The Chambers Brothers recorded a soul version of "What the World Needs Now Is Love" using gospel harmonies, on their album "The Time Has Come".

An instrumental version of the song was featured regularly on the Jerry Lewis MDA Telethon for many years, most frequently heard when pledge amounts were announced on the broadcast.

Burt Bacharach performs a version of the song in the 1997 American film Austin Powers: International Man of Mystery, with the film's director describing Bacharach's performance as "the heart of our film".

Missi Hale performs a version of the song for the closing credits of the animated film The Boss Baby.

Tom Clay version

In addition to the DeShannon hit recording and the numerous cover versions, "What the World Needs Now is Love" served as the basis for a distinctive 1971 remix. Disc jockey Tom Clay was working at radio station KGBS in Los Angeles, California, when he created the single "What the World Needs Now is Love/Abraham, Martin and John" (combining with the top 5 hit, in 1968, by Dion), a social commentary that became a surprise hit record that summer. The song begins with a man asking a young girl to define such words as bigotry, segregation, and hatred (to which the girl says she does not know); she says that prejudice is "when someone's sick". Following that is a soundbite of a drill sergeant leading a platoon into training, along with gunfire sound effects, after which are snippets of the two songs – both as recorded by the Blackberries, a session recording group. Interspersed are excerpts of speeches by John F. Kennedy, Robert F. Kennedy, the eulogy given (by Ted Kennedy) after Robert's assassination, and Martin Luther King Jr., and soundbites of news coverage of each assassination. The ending of the song is a reprise of the introduction.

"What the World Needs Now is Love/Abraham, Martin and John" rose to No. 8 on the Billboard Hot 100 in August 1971, and was Clay's only top 40 hit.Popular Youtube Version

Chart history

Weekly charts
Jackie DeShannon

Sweet Inspirations

Tom Clay (medley)

Dionne Warwick

Year-end charts

See also
 List of anti-war songs

References

Bibliography
Platts, Robin  (2003) Burt Bacharach & Hal David: What the World Needs Now, Collector's Guide Publishing,

External links
Hal David Recollections. Accessed June 2007.
Songfacts Accessed July 2008
Jackie de Shannon Discography, Accessed July 2008
 
 
 

1965 songs
1965 singles
1968 singles
1971 singles
1998 singles
Jackie DeShannon songs
Dionne Warwick songs
Sweet Inspirations songs
Adriano Celentano songs
Billie Jo Spears songs
Rick Astley songs
Will Young songs
Songs with music by Burt Bacharach
Songs with lyrics by Hal David
RPM Top Singles number-one singles
Imperial Records singles
Motown singles
Anti-war songs
Songs of the Vietnam War